Farrington is an unincorporated community in Chatham County, North Carolina, United States. It is now part of the Fearrington Village census-designated place.

There are three sites in Farrington listed on the National Register of Historic Places: John A. Mason House, O'Kelly's Chapel, and Joseph B. Stone House.

Geography 
Farrington is located at  (35.8018148 -79.0138990) about 8 miles (12.9 km) southeast of Chapel Hill on Farrington Point Road. It is to the north of Jordan Lake, a surrounding placemark.

References

Unincorporated communities in Chatham County, North Carolina
Unincorporated communities in North Carolina